{{Infobox video game
| title = Mary Skelter: Nightmares
| image = Mary Skelter decalless cover art.jpeg
| caption = 
| developer = Compile HeartIdea Factory
| publisher = 
| director = 
| producer = 
| designer = 
| artist = 
| writer = 
| composer = 
| series = 
| platforms = PlayStation VitaMicrosoft WindowsNintendo Switch
| released = PlayStation VitaMicrosoft WindowsNintendo Switch'| genre = Role-playing, dungeon crawler
| modes = Single-player
}}

 is a dungeon crawler role-playing video game for the PlayStation Vita developed and published by Compile Heart and Idea Factory. It was released on October 13, 2016 in Japan, September 19, 2017 in North America, and September 22, 2017 in Europe. It was followed by two sequels Mary Skelter 2 and Mary Skelter Finale, respectively.

Gameplay
The game is a first-person dungeon crawler role playing game where the player guides a party of Blood Maidens through living dungeons in order to reach each one's boss, the titular "Nightmares." When in battle within the dungeons, each Blood Maiden has a Blood gauge that lets them enter Massacre mode in order to temporally raise their stats and give them bonus skills. If left unchecked, however, the Blood gauge will cause the Blood Maidens to go into Blood Skelter mode and uncontrollably attack friend and foe alike.

Plot
The story starts with the main characters Jack and Alice escaping from a jail cell with the help of a group of supernaturally powerful girls called Blood Maidens. It turns out the entire city has been absorbed by a malignant being known as the Jail, and it has been releasing hostile monsters called Marchens. Realizing he has the power to assist the Blood Maidens, Jack joins their forces in order to escape the Jail.

ReceptionMary Skelter: Nightmares'' received generally favorable reviews. It received an aggregated score of 70.80% on GameRankings based on 10 reviews and 76/100 on Metacritic based on 14 reviews.

Hardcore Gamer's Chris Shive gave the game a 3.5/5, saying that while the game, "won't blow anyone away", it was still "a well put together, enjoyable experience."

References

External links
 
 

2016 video games
Compile Heart games
Role-playing video games
Dungeon crawler video games
PlayStation Vita games
Video games developed in Japan
Video games featuring female protagonists
Single-player video games
Windows games
Nintendo Switch games
LGBT-related video games
First-person party-based dungeon crawler video games
Idea Factory games
Ghostlight games